The following list of Romanians by net worth includes the 10 wealthiest Romanians individuals and families as determined by Forbes Romania. In addition to the annual rankings published by Forbes Romania, six Romanians are also featured in The World's Billionaires by Forbes.

Annual rankings
These lists only show the top 10 wealthiest Romanians for each year.

Legend

See also
 Lists of people by net worth

References 

 

Romanians
 
Lists of Romanian people
Demographics of Romania
Economy of Romania-related lists